"My Best Friend's Girl" is a song by American rock band the Cars from their 1978 self-titled debut album on Elektra Records, released on June 6 of that year. Written by Ocasek as a song about something that "probably ... happened to a lot of people," the track found radio success as a demo in 1977.

Written by Ric Ocasek and produced by Roy Thomas Baker, the song was released as the album's second single. It peaked at number 35 on the U.S. Billboard Hot 100 chart, and reached number three in the UK. It has since been positively received by critics and included in compilation albums for the band.

Background
"My Best Friend's Girl" was written by Ric Ocasek for the Cars' self-titled debut album. Ocasek later said the lyrics were not inspired by any personal incident, saying "Nothing in that song happened to me personally. I just figured having a girlfriend stolen was probably something that happened to a lot of people." Ocasek also said that the lyrics for the chorus were an afterthought, saying, "At some point, I realized my lyrics didn't include the words 'My Best Friend's Girl.' So I pulled out the lyrics someone had typed up and added a chorus in the margin in pen: 'She's my best friend's girl/She's my best friend's girl/But she used to be mine.

The song first appeared in 1977 on Boston radio stations WCOZ and WBCN from the said demo tape, along with "Just What I Needed". DJ Maxanne Sartori, who was given the tapes of these songs by Ric Ocasek, recalled, "I began playing the demos of 'Just What I Needed' and 'My Best Friend's Girl' in March during my weekday slot, from 2 to 6 p.m. Calls poured in with positive comments." Shortly thereafter, it became one of the stations' most requested songs.

Composition
"My Best Friend's Girl" begins with chords in the lower register of the guitar, a two-bar progression moving from I to IV to V in F. Hand claps enter in bar five, and after the eight-bar intro (following descending synthesizer sounds from David Robinson's Syndrums,) the first verse begins featuring Ric Ocasek's vocals over a lead guitar lick in the key of F. An electronic piano (a Yamaha CP-30) is introduced in the first chorus, followed by a rockabilly guitar lick which leads to the second verse. The song is composed in contrasting verse-chorus form. 
The song was originally written and recorded in E major, one semitone lower, then the entire master tape was sped up to place it in F major. Many live performances show the band performing the song in E.
The lyrics depict a man's frustration with a woman who is dating his best friend after the man dated her. The narrator coolly notes, "She's my best friend's girl, but she used to be mine."

Release
Released in October 1978, "My Best Friend's Girl" entered the US Billboard Hot 100 singles chart for the week ending October 21. It peaked at number 35 on the charts in December. In addition, the song reached number 40 on the Dutch Top 40, number 55 in Canada, and number 67 in Australia. The song was the highest-charting UK single of the band's career, peaking at number three in November 1978. 
The single was the first picture disc available commercially in the UK.

"My Best Friend's Girl" was included on the soundtrack to the film Over the Edge (1979), and the song appears on numerous compilation albums, such as the band's Greatest Hits (1985), Just What I Needed: The Cars Anthology (1995), and Complete Greatest Hits (2002). A live version of the song by the New Cars appears on their debut album, It's Alive! (2006). The song originates from late 1976-early 1977 as another successful demo, like "Just What I Needed", of the song was done.

Reception
Music critics have given the track generally favorable reviews.  Billboard Magazine described the song as a "melodic youth-oriented rocker" that uses "catchy handclaps" to generate the feel of an early 1960s song.  Cash Box said that "the guitar work is derivative but the enthusiasm is refreshing" and praised the vocals and organ playing. AllMusic's Donald A. Guarisco called the song "one of the classics of the Cars' catalog", 
and Rolling Stone writer Kit Rachlis called it a wonderful pop song. 
"My Best Friend's Girl" was ranked the 12th best song of 1978 by critics Dave Marsh and Kevin Stein, and it was named one of "The 1001 Best Songs Ever" in a 2003 issue of Q magazine. Some critics have noted the similarity in style of Fountains of Wayne's 2003 hit single "Stacy's Mom" to this song.

Track listing
7" vinyl
"My Best Friend's Girl" (Ocasek) – 3:44
"Moving in Stereo" (Hawkes, Ocasek) – 5:15

Personnel 

 Ric Ocasek – lead vocals, rhythm guitar
 Elliot Easton – lead guitar, backing vocals
 Benjamin Orr – backing vocals, bass guitar
 David Robinson – drums, percussion, Syndrums, backing vocals
 Greg Hawkes – keyboards, saxophone, backing vocals

Charts

Weekly charts

Year-end charts

References

The Cars songs
1978 singles
Songs written by Ric Ocasek
Song recordings produced by Roy Thomas Baker
Elektra Records singles
1978 songs
Songs about jealousy